Himachal Pradesh State Electricity Board Limited (HPSEBL) is a (state government undertaking) electricity board operating within the state of Himachal Pradesh, India,  that generates and supplies power through a network of transmission, sub- transmission, and distribution lines. Himachal Pradesh State Electricity Board which was constituted on 1 September 1971 in accordance with the provisions of Electricity Supply Act (1948) and has been reorganized as Himachal Pradesh State Electricity Board Limited from 2010 under company act 1956.

Restructuring 
The Himachal Pradesh State Electricity Board has been re-organized as Himachal Pradesh State Electricity Board Ltd. w.e.f. 14.06.2010 under Company Act.1956.

Functions 
HPSEBL is responsible for the supply of Uninterrupted & Quality power to all consumers in Himachal Pradesh. Power is being supplied through a network of Transmission, Sub-Transmission & Distribution lines laid in the state. Since its inception, Board has made long strides in executing the targets entrusted to it.

Himachal Pradesh Area Load Despatch Centre (HPALDC) 
Himachal Pradesh Area Load Despatch Center has been established to ensure integrated operation of the power system of HPSEBL with the Northern Region Load Dispatch Center of India to Monitor system parameters and security, System studies, planning and contingency analysis, Analysis of tripping and facilitating remedial measures, Daily scheduling and operational planning, Facilitating bilateral exchanges, Computation of energy dispatch and drawal values using SEMs, Augmentation of telemetry, computing and communication facilities.

Generation

Notable Achievements  

 Himachal Pradesh achieved 100 percent Electrification in to all its census villages in the year 1988.
 Ensured 24 x 7 uninterrupted Power Supply.
 Himachal Pradesh has the honor of providing electricity at lowest tariff in the country.
 Himachal Pradesh achieved unique distinction of 100% metering, billing and collection.
 Achieved highest household/consumer coverage ratio in the country i.e. about 98%  as per REC's survey & they have been adjudged one of the best Board's in the country.
 Installed and commissioned a power house at the highest altitude in the world (Rongtong Power House at an altitude of approx. 12,000 ft.).
 Installed and commissioned a totally underground Power House which is unique  in Asia (Bhaba Power House – 120 MW).
 Introduced Hassle-free online Utility Bill Payments Systems.
 Started 128-bit SSL encryption – secure e-commerce systems.
 Ensured safe and timely Energy bills payments using Credit/Debit cards or Net-banking

References

External links 
 Official Website  
 http://portal.hpseb.in/irj/go/km/docs/internet/New_Website/Pages/Home.html 
 Electricity Supply Act (1948) 
 Indian Electricity Act

State agencies of Himachal Pradesh
Energy in Himachal Pradesh
State electricity agencies of India
Energy companies established in 1971
1971 establishments in Himachal Pradesh